This is a list of legislatures by number and percentage of female members.

List of number and percentage of women in national legislatures

References